Governor McMullen may refer to:

Adam McMullen (1872–1959), 21st Governor of Nebraska
Richard McMullen (1868–1965), 59th Governor of Delaware